1100 Wilshire is a 37-story,  residential and commercial skyscraper completed in 1987 in Los Angeles, California. It is the 24th tallest building in the city, the 2nd tallest residential building in the entire Southern California region, and the 4th tallest residential building in the state of California. The  tower was designed by AC Martin Partners. The bottom 16 floors are primarily parking, with commercial space on the ground floor/street level. 1100 Wilshire was unsuccessful as an office building and sat nearly vacant for almost two decades. It was purchased by Hampton Development, TMG Partners and Forest City Residential for $40 million, and from 2005 to 2006 the property was converted to owner-occupied residential condominiums with 228 units.

In 2014, the building was used for a promotional stunt by GreatCall. In the ad, John Walsh, the company's spokesman at the time, jumps off the building and parachutes safely to the street, explaining the abilities of the 5Star Medical Alert System as he falls.

See also
List of tallest buildings in Los Angeles

References

Skyscrapers in Los Angeles
Office buildings completed in 1987
Residential buildings in Los Angeles
Residential skyscrapers in Los Angeles
Residential condominiums in the United States
Westlake, Los Angeles